The Department of Electrical Services (DES; Malay: Jabatan Perkhidmatan Elektrik) is an electric utility company in Brunei responsible for the generation, transmission and distribution of electricity to end users.

History
DES was originally established as Electrical Office in 1921. In 1953, its name was changed to the Department of Electrical Services.

Organization chart
 Director
 Deputy Director
 Corporate Planning and Services
 Generation
 Revenue Management
 Customer Services
 Transmission and Distribution

http://www.des.gov.bn/SitePages/Organisation%20Structure.aspx

Offices

 Bandar Seri Begawan
 Kuala Belait
 Seria
 Tanjung Bunut
 Temburong District
 Tutong

See also

 Electricity sector in Brunei

References

External links
 

Energy companies of Brunei
Public utilities established in 1921
1921 establishments in Brunei